Koiva-Mustjõe Landscape Conservation Area is a nature park situated in Võru County, Estonia.

Its area is 3196 ha.

The protected area was designated in 1957 to protect Koiva wooded meadow and its surrounding areas.

References

Nature reserves in Estonia
Geography of Võru County